Sandvika is a village in Stange Municipality in Innlandet county, Norway. The village is located along the lake Mjøsa, just across a bay from the city of Hamar. Statistics Norway considers this to be part of the Bekkelaget urban area, so its statistics are not tracked.

References

Stange
Villages in Innlandet